Milos Raonic was the defending champion, but lost in the second round to Mikhail Youzhny.

Alexander Zverev won his first ATP title, defeating Stan Wawrinka in the final, 6–2, 3–6, 7–5.

Seeds
The top four seeds receive a bye into the second round.

Draw

Finals

Top half

Bottom half

Qualifying

Seeds

Qualifiers

Qualifying draw

First qualifier

Second qualifier

Third qualifier

Fourth qualifier

References
 Main draw
 Qualifying draw

2016 Singles
2016 ATP World Tour
2016 in Russian tennis